Dipoenus and Scyllis were early ancient Greek sculptors from Crete who worked together and were said to have been pupils of Daedalus. Pliny assigns to them the date 580 BC, and says that they worked at Sicyon, which city from their time onwards became one of the great schools of sculpture. They also made statues for Cleonae and Argos. They worked in wood, ebony and ivory, and apparently also in marble.

References

6th-century BC Greek sculptors
Ancient Cretan sculptors
Ancient Greek sculptors
Articles about multiple people in ancient Greece
Art duos